Ceroctena is a genus of moths of the family Erebidae. The genus was erected by Achille Guenée in 1852.

Species
 Ceroctena amynta (Cramer, [1779])
 Ceroctena intravirens (Dognin, 1900)

References

Calpinae